Can't Live Without You or  I Can't Live Without You may refer to:
 "Can't Live Without You", a track from Mobile Orchestra, an album by American electronica project Owl City
 "Can't Live Without You", a track from Blackout (Scorpions album)
 "I Can't Live Without You", a song by Al Walser
 "I Can't Live Without You", a track from World Domination (Band-Maid album)
 Without You (Badfinger song)